"Alles wird vorübergehen" ("Everything will go by") is a song by German band Die Toten Hosen. It is the third single and fifth track from the album Zurück zum Glück.

The song is about how every feeling and everything will fade away with time, good or bad, and that one should really be happy about the present when everything is still fine.

Music video
The music video was directed by Paul Shyvers. It contains live footage.

Track listing
 "Alles wird vorübergehen" (von Holst/Frege) − 3:11
 "Alles wird vorübergehen - J.C's Dubbed 2 Death-Mix" - 4:28
 "Rockaway Beach" (Dee Dee Ramone) - 1:59 (Ramones cover)

Charts

2005 singles
Die Toten Hosen songs
Songs written by Campino (singer)
Songs written by Andreas von Holst
2004 songs